The first USS Harvard of the United States Navy was an auxiliary cruiser in the Spanish–American War. She was launched as City of New York, and later commissioned as Plattsburg (SP-1645) for service in World War I.

Originally a schooner-rigged steamship, she was launched in 1888 as City of New York by John Brown and Company, Clydebank, Scotland, for the Inman Line. Sister ship of City of Paris, City of New York was one of the largest and best liners of her day, and one of the first steamships with twin screws. She was transferred to American registry under the American Line in 1893 as New York. These ships brought the United States to the front rank in the Atlantic passenger trade, and New York established the record for the Southampton to New York crossing in September 1893.

Spanish–American War
At the outbreak of the Spanish–American War, New York was chartered as an auxiliary cruiser with a civilian crew, commissioning on 26 April 1898 at New York, Captain C. S. Cotton in command and renamed Harvard. Assigned as a scout, Harvard departed New York on 30 April to cruise West Indian waters in search of the Spanish fleet. After sending back several reports on the location of Spanish units in the Caribbean, Harvard was blockaded by a larger force at Saint-Pierre, Martinique from 11 to 17 May, after which she proceeded to Santiago de Cuba and St. Nicholas Mole, Haiti, with dispatches from Commodore Winfield Scott Schley. Interrupting her scouting duties, Harvard returned to Newport News, Virginia, 7–26 June during which time her crew was officially taken into the Naval Service.

Harvard returned to the Caribbean with troops and supplies, arriving at Altares, Cuba, about 1 July.  The morning of 3 July, she received the electrifying news that the Spanish fleet had sortied. After Rear Admiral William T. Sampson's smashing victory off Santiago, she rescued survivors. Despite the high surf and ammunition explosions from the stricken Spanish ships, Harvard succeeded in recovering over 600 officers and men.

On 4 July 1898, the 9th Massachusetts Volunteer Infantry were guarding the prisoners of war inside Harvard. A guard ordered a prisoner, who was attempting to cross the line, to return. The prisoner did not understand English and the guard fired a shot causing other prisoners to stand up. Fearing the prisoners were about to attack, the guards opened fire killing six prisoners and wounding thirteen more. After the investigation, it was concluded that it was a mistake. The tragedy was known as Harvard Incident.

No longer needed as a scout in the Caribbean, Harvard was sent back to the United States 10 July 1898. She was temporarily turned over to the War Department, and returned to Santiago de Cuba to transport troops back to the United States.  Harvard arrived at New York on 27 August and decommissioned 2 September 1898 at New York Navy Yard.

World War I and demise
Reverting to her old name, New York, the ship resumed transatlantic service with the American Line until World War I.  During this period she underwent extensive conversion in 1903, when one of her three funnels was removed. When United States joined World War I, again needed in support of American forces abroad, New York was chartered by the Navy 9 May 1918 for use as a troop transport. She commissioned as Plattsburg on 24 May 1918 and commanded by Claude C. Bloch.

Plattsburg made four voyages from New York to Liverpool transporting the American Expeditionary Force to Europe, and after the end of the war made a total of seven voyages, bringing home over 24,000 veterans. She returned to New York after her final crossing on 29 August 1919, and was returned to her owners on 6 October 1919.

As New York, the ship once again plied the Atlantic with passengers, but she was no longer a first-class liner and was withdrawn from service in 1920. Sold to the Polish Navigation Company, she made two more voyages, but the company was soon forced to close down and the ship was scrapped in 1923.

References

External links
 Maritimequest City of New York / USS Harvard / USS Plattsburg Photo Gallery
 Maritimequest City of New York / USS Harvard / USS Plattsburg Fact Sheet
 Spanish–American War – USS Harvard
 Photo gallery at Naval Historical Center

World War I transports of the United States
1888 ships
Ships built on the River Clyde
Spanish–American War auxiliary ships of the United States